For Freedom may refer to:

 For Freedom (1918 film), silent film
 For Freedom (1940 film), British film
 For Freedom, EP by Avalon